Harpullia is a genus of about 27 species of small to medium-sized rainforest trees from the family Sapindaceae. They have a wide distribution ranging from India eastwards through Malesia, Papuasia and Australasia to the Pacific Islands.  They grow naturally usually in or on the margins of rainforests or associated vegetation.

The major centre of diversity, of about twenty species, occurs throughout New Guinea including its surrounding islands and region.

Australia harbours another centre of smaller diversity, of about eight species, growing naturally from northeastern New South Wales through eastern Queensland to Cape York Peninsula and coastal Northern Territory. Of the eight Harpullia species which grow naturally Australia six occur only (endemic) in Australia. They have the common name tulipwoods and were prized for their dark coloured timber. The one most commonly known to Australian horticulture is Harpullia pendula which is widely planted as a street tree along the east coast. H. frutescens is a small shrub with horticultural potential.

Naming, descriptive studies and classifications
European science formally published the name and description of this genus and its H. cupanioides type specimen from India, in 1824, authored by Scottish botanist William Roxburgh. The genus name, Harpullia, derives from "Harpulli, "the vernacular name at Chittagong".

Recently in 2011 Japanese–American botanist Wayne Takeuchi formally published the name and description of H. mabberleyana, the "first member of the genus to be discovered in New Guinea since 1940".

In 2003 Dutch botanists R. M. Buijsen, Peter C. van Welzen and R. W. J. M. van der Ham published a morphological phylogenetics analysis and biogeography study of the whole genus. In 1995 Buijsen published a leaf anatomy study.

In 1994, 1985 and 1982 Dutch botanists Pieter W. Leenhouts and M. Vente published the treatment in Flora Malesiana, a natural species groups classification attempt and a taxonomic revision, respectively.

In 1985 and 1981 Australian botanist Sally T. Reynolds published updated names, known records and descriptions of the eight Australian species, in the Flora of Australia (series) and her scientific article, respectively.

In 1985 J. Mueller published a pollen anatomy and evolution study of the genus.

Also numerous studies of various Harpullia species' chemical constituents, often the saponins, have been published.

Species
This listing was sourced from the Australian Plant Name Index and Australian Plant Census, published peer reviewed scientific journal articles, Flora Malesiana, the Census of Vascular Plants of Papua New Guinea, the Australian Tropical Rainforest Plants information system, Fruits of the Australian Tropical Rainforest, the Flora of NSW online, the Flora of Australia (series), and the Checklist of the vascular indigenous Flora of New Caledonia.:

 Harpullia alata  – SE. Qld to NE. NSW endemic, Australia
 Harpullia arborea , syn.: H. pedicellaris  – Sri Lanka, India, Assam, Thailand, S. Vietnam, through Malesia incl. New Guinea, NE. Australia, Pacific Islands incl. Fiji, Vanuatu, Samoa, Tonga
 Harpullia austro-caledonica  – New Caledonia endemic
 Harpullia camptoneura  – NE. New Guinea
 Harpullia carrii  – Papua New Guinea
 Harpullia cauliflora  – New Guinea
 Harpullia crustacea  – E. New Guinea
 Harpullia cupanioides , syn.: H. thanatophora  – S. China, Assam, Andaman Islands, Bangladesh, Burma, Thailand, Indo-China, throughout Malesia incl. New Guinea, NT Australia
 Harpullia frutescens  – NE. Qld endemic, Australia
 Harpullia giganteacapsula  – E. New Guinea
 Harpullia hillii  – E. central Qld to NE. NSW endemic, Australia
 Harpullia hirsuta  – SW. New Guinea
 Harpullia largifolia  – New Guinea
 Harpullia leichhardtii  – coastal NT endemic, Australia
 Harpullia leptococca  – SE. New Guinea
 Harpullia longipetala  – E. New Guinea
 Harpullia mabberleyana  – New Guinea
 Harpullia myrmecophila  – NW. New Guinea
 Harpullia oococca  – New Guinea
 Harpullia peekeliana  – New Ireland (New Guinea)
 Harpullia pendula  – NE. Qld through E. Qld to NE. NSW Australia
 Harpullia petiolaris  – Borneo, Moluccas, New Guinea
 Harpullia ramiflora , syn.: H. aeruginosa  – Philippines, Moluccas, New Guinea, Cape York Peninsula Australia
 Harpullia rhachiptera  – New Guinea
 Harpullia rhyticarpa  – NE. Qld endemic, Australia
 Harpullia solomonensis  – Solomon Islands, Bismarck Archipelago
 Harpullia vaga  – Solomon Islands, Malesia incl. New Guinea

Formerly included here
Harpullia zanguebarica   ⇒  Majidea zanguebarica  – E. Africa

References

Cited works

 
 
 

 

Flora of New Guinea
Flora of Papua New Guinea
Flora of New South Wales
Flora of Queensland
Trees of Vanuatu
Flora of Malesia
Sapindaceae genera
Sapindales of Australia